Ľubomír Luhový (born 31 March 1967) is a former Slovak football player and manager. He is former sporting director of Třinec. In his club career he played mostly for FK Inter Bratislava.

Club career
Luhový played for FC Martigues in the French Ligue 2 during the 1991–92 season.

International career
Luhový made two appearances for the full Czechoslovakia national football team. He also made nine appearances for the full Slovakia national football team.

Management career
Luhový started as manager of FC Nitra and Fotbal Třinec in the Czech 2. Liga on 7 October 2010. He was replaced as manager in April 2012, with Třinec 13th in the table. However Luhový stayed on at the club in a new role, as sporting director.

Career statistics

Club

International

References

External links
 Profile at ČMFS website
 
 

1967 births
Living people
Association football forwards
Czechoslovak footballers
Slovak footballers
Czechoslovakia international footballers
Sportspeople from Považská Bystrica
Slovakia international footballers
FK Inter Bratislava players
FC Spartak Trnava players
FC Petržalka players
FC Martigues players
Grazer AK players
Urawa Red Diamonds players
Slovak expatriate footballers
Expatriate footballers in Japan
Slovak expatriate sportspeople in Austria
Slovak Super Liga players
Ligue 2 players
J1 League players
Austrian Football Bundesliga players
Dual internationalists (football)
Slovak football managers
FK Fotbal Třinec managers
Czechoslovak expatriate footballers
Expatriate footballers in France
Czechoslovak expatriate sportspeople in France
Slovak expatriate sportspeople in Japan
FC Nitra managers
MŠK Púchov players
FK Dukla Banská Bystrica players
Czech National Football League managers